Labeo lankae is a species of cyprinid fish. It is endemic to Sri Lanka.

Description
Rostral fold developed and overlapping upper lip. Maxillary barbels present, whereas rostral barbels are rudimentary or absent. There are 10–12 branched rays on dorsal fin. There are 36–39 scales on lateral line. A hazy black stripe which is originating behind the operculum and extending to caudal peduncle. All fins with reddish suffusion. Body rosy grey dorsally with metallic green margins. A blotch on caudal peduncle. This blotch disappears when the fish is stressed. Sclera of eye is red in color.

Habitat
It is found in moderate flowing streams with a substrate of large rocks and boulders closer to dense riparian vegetation.

References

lankae
Fish of Sri Lanka
Fish described in 1952
Taxonomy articles created by Polbot